Ram Prasad Khanal is a Nepalese musician, distinguished class singer, and folk-music activist. He has worked for the growth and development of Nepali folk music for decades. He is an author, journalist, artist, actor, composer, and radio and TV program producer, director and presenter. He serves as President of the International Artists Forum. He has mainly been known for his Nepali folk and duet songs and his activism in the field of folk music.

Khanal moved to the United States of America a decade ago and has been living there with his family since then. In the US, he is involved in different business activities.

He started a program titled , based on folk duet songs, on Nepal Television in 1998, which considerably promoted his fame in the field. This program not only popularized the Nepali folk and duet songs, but it also contributed profoundly to the renaissance of Nepali folk music. The folk movement that this program pushed throughout the country created a conducive environment in which many folk singers were born.

Though he is living in the US with a green card granted to him in the Extraordinary Ability EB-1 visa category, he is still contributing to Nepali folk songs, duet songs, folk culture, and Nepali language and literature from overseas. Khanal, who has worked to promoted Nepali folk music and establish it in the international arena, has had seventeen poetry anthologies and ghazals published. While he has released forty-eight albums of Nepali folk music, he also has more than one thousand two hundred lyrics published and broadcast.

He has been awarded the Prabal Gorakha Dakshina Bahu, one of the most prestigious Nepali national awards granted to civilians, for his exceptional contribution to Nepali folk music, duet songs and the entire field of Nepali music by the government of Nepal. Along with this, he has also been granted more than four hundred awards and prizes in Nepal and beyond. One of the significant of them is 'Man of the Year 2004 for Nepal International Award that was awarded to him by the American Biographical Institute (ABI).

Early life and education
He was born in Dharampani, Hardineta, Maindanda, Gulmi District, Nepal. He was born as the second child, among seven siblings, to Bhavishor Khanal (father) and Rundata Devi Khanal (mother). He was born in a middle-class family, and his father worked in Assam Rifles, India. He completed his primary education in Maindanda Lower Secondary School, Hardineta, Dharampani, and secondary education in Shree Adarsha Secondary School, Digam, Gulmi. He studied in Butwal Multiple Campus and completed his master's degree (sociology) at Tribhuvan University, Kirtipur later.

Marriage 
Khanal married Tirtha Paudel from Rimuwa, Gulmi in 1993. They have a son (Gyanendra Khanal) and a daughter (Susma Khanal). He currently lives in Virginia, United States together with his family.

Careers in music 

Khanal had a strong interest in music from a very young age, consequently winning him the first prizes in various contests in different levels. In addition to music, he also had an interest in dance. He passed the vocal test in Radio Nepal three decades ago and since then he has been active in the field of music. He has forty-eight music albums published in his name. Some of his popular duet songs are "", "", "", and "". Similarly, other popular numbers include "", "", "", "", "", "", "", and "". The latest panche baja folk songs such as "", and "" and other songs are equally popular.

Career in journalism 
Khanal started his journalism career together with his studies in 1987. He started to publish his news and other literary creations in the Tansen-based  and Butwal-based X-ray Weekly. He not only wrote news, but also involved himself in the registration and marketing of the newspaper  in Butwal in 1989. He started to publish  weekly in which he had the roles of both publisher and editor. It was published in print until he moved to the US. In 2007, he began publishing it in an online version as www.nepalmother.com, in which he is publisher and chief editor.

Career in Radio Nepal 
After the restoration of democracy in Nepal in 1990, a program entitled  was very popular on Radio Nepal. He started to work for the program from Butwal as a representative of Lumbini Zone. In 1998, he joined Radio Nepal as the presenter, producer and director of the program . He also worked for BBC Radio from 1991 to 1995 as a freelancer.

Career in Nepal Television 
Khanal started his television career as an actor at Nepal Television on the program  conducted by artist and comedian Santosh Panta. From 1996 to 1999, he acted in the popular show , which was directed by actor and director Santosh Pant. He started the popular show  in 1998 and worked as producer, presenter and director. At a time when pop music was a trend in Nepal and folk music was overshadowed, his program not only popularized Nepali folk music but also gave birth to many new singers in the field. Due to the popularity of this program,  programs started on other television stations as well. Similarly, many pubs in Kathmandu and outside the valley started to present live  shows on a daily basis in the evenings. Khanal had direct and indirect roles in the changing trend. Khanal also served Nepal Television Management Board as a member of the Board of Directors.

Journey to the USA 
Prior to his permanent residency in the US from 2006, Khanal had visited the United States thirteen times. He got an American Green Card under the Extraordinary Ability EB-1 visa category in 2007. After working for Walmart in the role of Customer Service Manager for two and half years, he started his own business in the grocery store, gas station and real estate industries in 2010. In addition to his business, he is also continuing his work in literature, music and journalism. Since moving to Washington, D.C., there has been an increase in the literary, cultural, and musical activities of the Nepali diaspora.

Social engagement 
Khanal took a leading role in establishing the International Artists Forum in 2008 for promoting Nepali art, culture, literature and music internationally. He is the founding chairman of the forum, which has united artists and litterateurs from around 35 countries. He has also worked for the Washington, D.C. Metro Committee Chair of the International Nepali Literature Society. Similarly, he has also worked for social organizations such as Reiyukai, Red Cross, and Lions Club. He is currently the Chair of US-based International Media and Entertainment House and Khanal Business Group and American Supermarket. He is also engaged with other dozens of social organizations. In addition, he is the chief editor and publisher of nepalmother.com.

Awards 
 Gorkha Dakshin Bahu, Nepal Government, 2004
 , Nepal Government, 2005
 Man of the Year 2004 for Nepal, American Biographical Institute (ABI), 2004
 Star of the year, 2019 by Star of the king, Qatar. 
 Nepal Scout national Journalism award by Nepal Scouts, 2004
 Folk and Duet Hero, Khanal Sewa Samaj, 2004
 Outstanding Folk Duet Prize, United Nations, 2004
 Education Journalism and Singing Prize, World Health Organization, 1995
 Nearly four hundred fifty national and regional prizes and awards

References

External links
 Ram Prasad Khanal's Official Website
 Ram Prasad Khanal's Facebook Page
 Ram Prasad Khanal's Twitter
 Ram Prasad Khanal's Youtube Channel

People from Gulmi District
Tribhuvan University alumni
Living people
Nepalese male writers
Nepali-language writers
Year of birth missing (living people)
Dohori singers